Paul H. Knepper from Tamaqua, Pennsylvania, was an aircraft engineer. He worked at several aircraft companies before becoming an instructor at the Pittsburgh Institute of Aeronautics. Here he designed his first airplane. He built the Ka-1 Crusader as a prototype for a training plane that he had planned to commercially produce in Lehighton, Pennsylvania. The two-seater featured an innovative tricycle landing gear with a wheel under its nose that prevented the tail from dragging upon landing.

Although advanced for its day the Crusader was never commercially produced as the Second World War forced a halt in the manufacture of commercial aircraft.
In 1990 friends of Paul Knepper restored the Crusader and donated it to the State Museum of Pennsylvania.

References

Aircraft designers
People from Tamaqua, Pennsylvania